Ellerbach may refer to:
Ellerbach (Altenau), a tributary of the Altenau in North Rhine-Westphalia, Germany
Ellerbach (Moselle), a tributary of the Moselle in Rhineland-Palatinate, Germany
Ellerbach (Nahe), a tributary of the Nahe in Rhineland-Palatinate, Germany
Ellerbach (Saale), a tributary of the Saale in Saxony-Anhalt, Germany
Ellerbach, a part of Taiskirchen im Innkreis, Ried im Innkreis, Upper Austria, Austria

People with the surname
Burkhard von Ellerbach (1373-1404), politician in the Prince-Bishopric of Augsburg
Herren von Ellerbach, enfeoffed in 1407 with a castle and town in Laupheim, Germany
John Ellerbach and Bertold Ellerbach, brothers of the Szentgyörgyi family, appointed to Voivod of Transylvania in 1465 by King Matthias 
Ellerbach family, a family of 14th century Kőszeg, Hungary
Werner von Ellerbach, first abbot of Wiblingen Abbey
Anna von Ellerbach, second founder of Irsee Abbey at Irsee near Kaufbeuren in Bavaria
Heinrich von Ellerbach, former provost of Buxheim Charterhouse